Lodi Township is one of the fourteen townships of Athens County, Ohio, United States. The 2010 census found 1,425 people in the township.

Geography
Located in the southern part of the county, it borders the following townships:
Canaan Township - north
Rome Township - northeast corner
Carthage Township - east
Orange Township, Meigs County - southeast corner
Bedford Township, Meigs County - south
Scipio Township, Meigs County - southwest corner
Alexander Township - west
Athens Township - northwest corner

No municipalities are located in Lodi Township.

Name and history
Lodi Township was organized in 1826.

It is the only Lodi Township statewide.

Communities served
 Anthony
 Garden
 Shade

Government
The township is governed by a three-member board of trustees, who are elected in November of odd-numbered years to a four-year term beginning on the following January 1. Two are elected in the year after the presidential election and one is elected in the year before it. There is also an elected township clerk, who serves a four-year term beginning on April 1 of the year after the election, which is held in November of the year before the presidential election. Vacancies in the clerkship or on the board of trustees are filled by the remaining trustees.

References

External links
Township website
County website

Townships in Athens County, Ohio
1826 establishments in Ohio
Populated places established in 1826
Townships in Ohio